The Mean Machine is an album by American jazz organist Jimmy McGriff recorded in 1976 and released on the Groove Merchant label.

Reception 

Allmusic's Jason Ankeny said: "Ironically enough, Mean Machine captures Jimmy McGriff at his sweetest. Employing electric piano as much as his signature organ, its grooves are disappointingly tepid, favoring a CTI-inspired smooth jazz approach at odds with McGriff's essential funkiness. Brad Baker's lush arrangements are largely to blame here, evoking the sound but not the kinetic energy of blaxploitation cinema".

Track listing
 "It Feels So Nice (Do It Again)" (Brad Baker, Lance Quinn) − 6:04
 "The Mean Machine" (Baker, Joe Thomas) − 5:54
 "Please Don't Take Me Out" (Baker) − 6:05
 "Get Back' (John Lennon, Paul McCartney) − 5:30
 "Overweight Shark Bait" (Robert Kriener) − 4:41
 "Pogo's Stick" (Quinn) − 5:55

Personnel
Jimmy McGriff – electric piano, clavinet, synthesizer, arranger
Joe Thomas  – tenor saxophone, flute
John Frosk, Alan Rubin − trumpet
Tom Malone − trombone
Lewis Del Gatto − baritone saxophone
Pat Rebillot − keyboards
Lance Quinn − guitar, arranger
Cornell Dupree, Jerry Friedman − guitar
Bob Babbitt − electric bass
Jerry Marotta, Rick Marotta − drums
Carlos Martin − congas
Jimmy Maelen − percussion
Tony Posk, John Pinntaville, Norman Carr, Harold Kohan, Rick Santhomme, Leo Kahn, Fred Buldrini, Alvin Rogers − violin
Julien Barber, Richard Maximoff − viola
Jesse Levy, Richard Locker − cello
Brad Baker − arranger, conductor

References

Groove Merchant albums
Jimmy McGriff albums
1976 albums
Albums produced by Sonny Lester